John Brunner may refer to:

 Sir John Brunner, 1st Baronet (1842–1919), British industrialist and Liberal Member of Parliament
 John L. Brunner (1929–1980), Pennsylvania politician
 Sir John Brunner, 2nd Baronet (1865–1929), British Liberal Member of Parliament
 John Brunner (author) (1934–1995), British author, mainly of science fiction

See also
 Brunner (disambiguation)
 Brunner baronets